Birkenshaw may refer to:

Places
Birkenshaw, North Lanarkshire – near Uddingston
Birkenshaw, West Yorkshire
Birkenshaw and Tong railway station
BBG Academy (formerly Birkenshaw Middle School)

People
Jack Birkenshaw (born 1940), English cricketer, umpire, coach and commentator
Robert Birkenshaw (died 1526), English priest, Canon of Winchester

See also
John Birkinshaw